tri-Crescendo is a Japanese video game developer. It was founded in February 1999 by Hiroya Hatsushiba, who still runs the company. Hatsushiba, originally being a sound programmer, carried his experience into tri-Crescendo; the company was initially responsible for the sound in all games by tri-Ace starting with Valkyrie Profile until 2001 when the company co-created Baten Kaitos with Monolith Soft. tri-Crescendo then went on to make Eternal Sonata for the Xbox 360 and PlayStation 3 and Fragile Dreams: Farewell Ruins of the Moon for the Wii.

tri-Crescendo was responsible for the programming and sound design in both the first Baten Kaitos and the prequel, Baten Kaitos Origins. In the first game battle planning was handled by Hiroya Hatsushiba, from tri-Crescendo and Yoshiharu Kuwabara from Monolith Soft, however in the second game it was handled by tri-Crescendo themselves led by Shuhei Rokumoto.

Games developed

References

External links
  

Video game companies established in 1999
Software companies based in Tokyo
Tri-Ace
Video game companies of Japan
Video game development companies
Japanese companies established in 1999